Dope Boy Fresh may refer to:

"Doe Boy Fresh", a 2007 song by Three Six Mafia
"Jockin' Jay-Z (Dopeboy Fresh)", a 2008 song by Jay-Z